The Brabham BT36 was an open-wheel Formula 2 race car, designed by Ron Tauranac, and developed and built by British racing team and constructor, Brabham, for the 1971 European Formula Two Championship. Its best result that season was a 2nd-place finish in the championship for Argentine Carlos Reutemann, despite only winning one race, taking one pole position. His consistency and pace made up for this, scoring 6 podium finishes, and finishing the season with 40 points. The Brabham BT36 was constructed out of a complex tubular space frame, and was powered by the naturally-aspirated  Ford-FVA Cosworth four-cylinder engine, which produced , and drove the rear wheels through a 5-speed Hewland F.T.200 manual transmission.

References

Brabham racing cars
Formula Two cars
1970s cars